Strawberry blite (Blitum capitatum, syn. Chenopodium capitatum) is an edible annual plant, also known as blite goosefoot, strawberry goosefoot, strawberry spinach, Indian paint, and Indian ink.

It is native to most of North America throughout the United States and Canada, including northern areas.  It is considered to be endangered in Ohio.  It is also found in parts of Europe and New Zealand.

Fruit are small, pulpy, bright red and edible, resembling strawberries, though their taste is more bland. The juice from the fruit was also used as a red dye by native North Americans. The fruits contain small, black, lens-shaped seeds that are 0.7–1.2 mm long. The greens contain vitamins A and C; they are edible raw when young or as a potherb. If raw they should be eaten in moderation as they contain oxalates. The seeds may be toxic in large amounts.

Strawberry blite is found in moist mountain valleys.

References

Sources

Global Biodiversity Information via archive.org
Britton, Nathaniel Lord and Brown, Addison "An Illustrated Flora of the Northern United States, Canada, and the British Possessions", published by C. Scribner's Sons, 1913.
United States National Museum "Contributions from the United States National Herbarium", published by Government Printing Office, 1890.
Von Mueller, Ferdinand "Select Extra-tropical Plants Readily Eligible for Industrial Culture Or Naturalization", published by G.S. Davis, 1884.
Coulter, John Merle and Nelson, Aven "New Manual of Botany of the Central Rocky Mountains (vascular Plants)", published by American Book Company, 1909.

External links

  USDA Plants Profile for Chenopodium capitatum (blite goosefoot) — formerly Blitum capitatum.
  — formerly Blitum capitatum.
 Northernbushcraft.com: Edibility of Chenopodium capitatum — formerly Blitum capitatum.
  — formerly Blitum capitatum.
 
 

capitatum
Flora of Canada
Flora of the Eastern United States
Flora of the Western United States
Flora of California
Leaf vegetables
Plants described in 1753
Taxa named by Carl Linnaeus
Flora without expected TNC conservation status